The majority of rivers in Nicaragua are located on the Caribbean coast and empty out into the Caribbean Sea. The Río San Juan is one of the most important rivers in Nicaragua, it borders Costa Rica and connects the Caribbean Sea to Lake Cocibolca . The Nicaragua Canal was a proposed project for an inter-Oceanic canal to transport cargo ships coming in from the Pacific to the Caribbean, or vice versa, instead of sailing down around Cape Horn. As of 2007 the project is still being considered.

The Río Grande and its tributaries are the most extensive river system, while the Río Escondido provides a major transportation route between the Pacific and Caribbean coasts. The Río Coco, locally known as the Wanks, runs along the border with Honduras and is the longest river in Central America. Other important rivers include Río Tipitapa, which links Lake Cocibolca to Lake Managua and covers 1,050 km² (405 sq mi).

List of rivers in Nicaragua
 Río Amaka
 Río Carepicha 
 Río Bambana
 Río Bocay
 Río Coco – known locally as the Wanks, borders Honduras and is the longest river in Central America.
 Río Escondido
 Río Grande de Matagalpa
 Río San Juan – borders Costa Rica
 Río Kukalaya
 Río Kurinwás
 Río Mi
 Río Siquia
 Río Tipitapa
 Río Tuma
 Río Wawa
 River NÖamani

By drainage basin
This list is arranged by drainage basin, with respective tributaries indented under each larger stream's name.

Atlantic Ocean

Coco River (Segovia River) (Wanki River)
Waspuk River
Lakus River
Bocay River
Amaka River
El Jicaro River
Estili River
Ulang River
Wawa River (Huahua River)
Likus River
Kukalaya River
Layasiksa River
Prinzapolka River
Bambana River
Yaoya River
Uli River
Wani River
Río Grande de Matagalpa
Tuma River
Iyás River
Yaosca River
Murra River
Olama River
Kurinwás River
Wawasang River
Escondido River
Kama River
Mahogany River
Rama River
Plata River
Mico River
Siquia River
Kukra River
Punta Gorda River
Maíz River
Indio River
San Juan River
Sábalos River
Lake Nicaragua
Tule River
Canastro River
Tepenaguasapa River
Oyate River
Ojocuapa River
Acoyapa River
Mayales River
Cuisalá River
Malacatoya River
Tipitapa River
Lake Managua
Viejo River (Grande River)
Sinecapa River
Ochomogo River
Sapoá River
Niño River (Pizote River)
Papaturro River
Zapote River
Frío River

Pacific Ocean

Rio Brito
Río Negro
Estero Real River
Tecomapa River
Tamarindo River
Tecolapa River
Casares River
Escalante River

See also 

 Water resources management in Nicaragua
List of rivers of the Americas by coastline

References

Rand McNally, The New International Atlas, 1993.
CIA map, 1997.
UN map, 2004.
Weller Cartographic Services map, 1998.
Instituto Nicaragüense de Estudio Territoriales department maps, 2001. (in Spanish)
, GEOnet Names Server

Nicaragua
Rivers
Nicaragua